Shadi Ghosheh (born 5 December 1987) is a football player.

Born in Italy, he is of Tunisian and Jordanian descent.

Biography

Youth career
Born in Rome, capital of Italy, Ghosheh started his career at Rome club Urbetevere. He left for Rosetana in 2004–05 season, played in Berretti under-20 team. In January 2005 he left for Messina. The club signed him outright at the end of season. In 2006–07 season, he left for Cisco Roma's Berretti team.

Lega Pro clubs
In mid-2007 he left for Igea Virtus. After Messina bankrupted, he became free agent In July he left for Chievo and sold to Bassano in co-ownership deal for a peppercorn fee of €500. Ghosheh made his non-competitive debut on 25 July

In June 2011 Bassano bought the remain 50% registration rights from Chievo for €15,000. Ghosheh also signed a new 2-year contract.

In 2013–14 to 2014–15 season he played for 4 Lega Pro clubs, namely Delta Porto Tolle, Pro Vercelli, Venezia and Catanzaro.

On 4 September 2015 Ghosheh was signed by Monopoli.

References

External links
  
 
 Football.it 

Italian footballers
Footballers from Rome
1987 births
Living people
Italian people of Tunisian descent
Italian people of Jordanian descent
Italian sportspeople of African descent
Association football fullbacks
A.C.R. Messina players
A.S.D. Igea Virtus Barcellona players
Bassano Virtus 55 S.T. players
U.S. Alessandria Calcio 1912 players
F.C. Pro Vercelli 1892 players
Venezia F.C. players
U.S. Catanzaro 1929 players
S.S. Monopoli 1966 players
S.S. Racing Club Fondi players
A.S.D. Pol. Tamai players
Serie C players
Serie D players